Arthur Marshall was a Scotland international rugby football player.

Rugby Union career

Amateur career

Marshall played for Edinburgh Academicals.

Provincial career

Marshall played for Edinburgh District in the 1874–75 season and the 1875–76 season.

International career

He was capped once for Scotland on 8 March 1875.

Family

Marshall was the son of David Captain Marshall and Christina Thomson Morgan. Arthur was one of their seven children.

It was noted that Marshall died in Erpingham, Chislehurst in the borough of Bromley on the 9 December 1909, following an operation.

References

1855 births
1909 deaths
Scottish rugby union players
Scotland international rugby union players
Edinburgh Academicals rugby union players
Rugby union players from Edinburgh
Edinburgh District (rugby union) players
Rugby union forwards